A Place for My Stuff is American comedian George Carlin's ninth album. Unlike his previous albums, which consisted entirely of stand-up performance, A Place For My Stuff contains a number of studio-recorded tracks, typically poking fun at the format and candor of community radio, commercials and television.

Track listing

References

1981 albums
George Carlin albums